Ctenodactyla is a genus of beetles in the family Carabidae, containing the following species:

 Ctenodactyla angusta Liebke, 1938
 Ctenodactyla batesii Chaudoir, 1861
 Ctenodactyla brasiliensis Lucas, 1857
 Ctenodactyla chevrolatii Dejean, 1825
 Ctenodactyla drapiezii Gory, 1833
 Ctenodactyla elegantula Liebke, 1931
 Ctenodactyla glabrata Bates, 1871
 Ctenodactyla langsdorfii Klug, 1834
 Ctenodactyla puncticollis Chaudoir, 1862
 Ctenodactyla santarema Liebke, 1933

References

Ctenodactylinae